Valencia, officially the Municipality of Valencia,  is a 1st class municipality in the province of Negros Oriental, Philippines. According to the 2020 census, it has a population of 38,733 people.

The municipality was voted as "the greenest and cleanest" town of Negros Oriental in 2007.

Our Lady of the Abandoned is the patroness of Valencia, and her feast day is celebrated annually every October 12 with the town fiesta. The fiesta is an official non-working holiday for the town.

History
Valencia was originally named Ermita, which means "a secluded place", due to its being a refuge from marauding Muslim pirates. In 1856, it was renamed Nueva Valencia by Spanish colonizers, in honor of its parish priest Father Matias Villamayor from Valencia, Spain.  He also had a fountain brought over from his aforementioned hometown, which currently sits in front of the Town Hall.

In 1920, it was renamed Luzurriaga (often times misspelt as Luzuriaga) in honour of Don Carlos Ruíz de Luzurriaga, a delegate from Negros island to the Philippine Legislature who promised town officials he would work hard to help improve the town. The town reverted to Valencia in 1948, by virtue of Republic Act 252.

During World War II,  Malabo was the headquarters of the Free Government and resistance movement in Negros Oriental.
 
In 2007, its Municipal Police Station which is under the Negros Oriental Provincial Police Office (NOPPO) headed by Senior Superintendent Melvin Ramon Buenafe) was adjudged the “Municipal Police Station of 2007” in the best unit awards category, and the best town police station in the Central Visayas (General order number 110 dated January 22, 2008).

Geography
The climate in the municipality is relatively cool, especially at higher elevations.

The region is also the most critical watershed area of Negros Oriental, providing abundant drinking water to Valencia and its neighboring municipalities.

Barangays
The town is politically subdivided into 24 barangays.

Climate

Demographics

The Cebuano language is the common vernacular in Valencia. Hiligaynon, Tagalog, and English are also widely spoken.

Economy 

The economy of Valencia is largely based on agriculture. Major products include abaca, copra, corn, flowers, vegetables, root crops, and exotic fruits such as lanzones and rambutan.

The municipality is also the site of a geothermal power station operated by the Energy Development Corporation. It generates electricity that supplies the needs of Negros, Panay, and parts of Cebu. The municipal government receives royalties from the power station.

Valencia, specifically, has a 20-megawatt Palinpinon 2 Geothermal Optimization Project in Sitio Nasuji, Barangay Puhagan, 35 kilometers from Dumaguete. The P 1.74-billion geothermal optimization (expansion) project, funded the Development Bank of the Philippines (DBP) is part of EDC's 192-MW Southern Negros Geothermal Production Field that supplies the power needs of 8 provinces in Negros, Panay, Guimaras and Cebu Islands. Valencia's 192-MW Palinpinon I and II geothermal field ranks 4th in installed capacity nationwide. The Palinpinon field contributed $457.8 million in 2004 foreign exchange savings for 2004, and also generated $267 million savings from January to July, 2008.

Because Palinpinon is such a big source of geothermal energy, Gloria Macapagal Arroyo said it received P 250 million in royalties, applied for livelihood, education, related projects, and also for the 50% subsidy on Valencia electric bills consumers.
Many residents also work in the nearby city of Dumaguete.

Tourism
The Filipino-Japanese Amity Memorial Shrine is located in Valencia. It stands at the foot of Mount Talinis and marks the spot where the combined Filipino and American troops including the Negrosanon guerrilla units fought the Japanese Imperial Army toward the end of World War II.

Eco-tourism sites include:
Tejero Highland Resort and Adventure Park - is the newest attraction in Central Philippines to offer the best value-for-your-money relaxation and recreation facility. It features a speed dual zipline, ATVs, segway, Aquazorb, slide, natural pools, restaurant and hotel. Located only 3 kilometers from town proper of Valencia, Tejero is the nearest natural attraction from Dumaguete, and considered the most popular of tourist destinations.
Casaroro Waterfalls - as the province's most photographed body of water, it is relatively enclosed by lush greenery and natural rock formations. The falls' cool water gushes down to a swimming hole.
The Forest Camp Resort -  was first opened in 1990, as a 6,000 square meter property, today its 2.2 hectares of land is a vast camping ground, with 2 large nipa hut houses, 4 cottages, a tree house, a 250-people capacity conference/reception hall, a backpacker's den and a dormitory that can hold up to 20 students.
The Spanish Fountain - a relic of the town's colorful historical past at the heart of the municipal plaza, has a unique sunken design, and was once the town's major source of water supply (invented by an Augustinian Recollect Friars to channel water from an upland spring).
Cata-al War Memorabilia - a private collection by an 84-year-old World War II survivor Porforio Cata-al,  at his residence cum museum. It includes bombs, grenades, Japanese and American bills, coins, medals, charred pieces of an authentic military uniform, and a Japanese soldier mummy
Filipino-American-Japanese Amity Shrine - on a hilltop of Sagbang, this is a 3-sided pillar representing the 3 countries (Philippines, America and Japan), unveiled in 1977.
Banica Swimming Lagoon - known as Tejeros resort, it has 2 man made pools fed by Banica River.
Malabo/Pulangbato Falls - is a swimming and diving hole with many reddish rocks. 
Red Rock Hot Spring - dipping pool 
Mount Talinis - a 1,903-meter peak in the Cuernos de Negros which has a number of volcanic lakes and extensive biodiversity.
Balinsasayao Twin Lakes Natural Park - a protected area near Mount Talinis surrounding two crater lakes.

Education

Public High Schools

Public Elementary Schools

Government

List of former chief executives

References

External links

 The travel guide Wikivoyage includes Valencia in its Dumaguete article.
 [ Philippine Standard Geographic Code]
Philippine Census Information
Local Governance Performance Management System

Municipalities of Negros Oriental